Mega Model (often abbreviated as Image Mega Model) is a Nepalese reality television show in which a number of young Nepalese women compete against each other to win for the title of Mega Model and an opportunity to start their career in the modeling industry. The premiere is set to air on September 25, 2010 and the season finale in which the top 6 compete against each other on a stage is coming live on Image Channel.

The show's format was originally created by Indian's reality modelling show Get Gorgeous.

Mega Model has had 2 Model hosts to date.  For Season 1, Pallavi Dhakal and currently, for Mega Model Season 2 is hosted by former model & beauty queen Sahana Bajracharya.  Like its American version, Mega Model features a photographer and model on its judging panel, Raj Bhai Suwal, Sneh Rana and Sijan Bhattachan.

In 2015, Nagma Shrestha posted in her Facebook page that she will be the new host for the third season of Image Mega Model but later on, Malvika Subba replaced her from Episode 10.

Cycles

Season 1

Season 1 begin on June 12, 2008. The host is Pallavi Dhakal. The other judges are Ruby Rana and Sijan Bhattachan. The cast consist of 16 girls who will compete for the title of Image Mega Model.

Prizes

The winner of Mega Model wins a contract to appear in a music video, a 6-page fashion editorial spread as well as the front cover in Wave Magazine and many other prize from the sponsor.

Contestants

(ages stated are at time of contest)

Season 2
New host Sahana Bajracharya, with Sijan Bhattachan, Sneh Rana and returning judge Raj Bhai Suwal all join together as the second season introduces a new format. The show started with 3 weeks audition sessions and 1 week bootcamp where they reduced the 50 semi-finalists into top 14 finalists for the main competition. Every week the girls were groomed interims of posing, catwalk and communication; in the end of each week the judges evaluated the girls through their photo which they took part in a photoshoot that week. And one or more girls were eliminated every week until the top 6, who took part in a live finale show which declared the winner through the judges and the public vote.

In order of elimination

(ages stated are at time of contest)

Call-out order

 The contestant was part of a non-elimination bottom three
 The contestant was eliminated
  The contestant won the competition

 Episode 1-3, featured the auditions. The top fifty girls were reduced to final fourteen who moved on to the main competition.
 In episode 4, Priyanka, Prakiti and Seela landed in the bottom three. None of them were eliminated. 
 In episode 5, Pratija and Priyanka landed in the bottom two. Both of them were eliminated

Photo shoot guide

 Episode 3 Photo shoot: Casting
 Episode 4 Photo shoot: Victorian Era
 Episode 5 Photo shoot: Zodiac Signs
 Episode 6 Photo shoot: Pose with male model
 Episode 7 Catwalk: In Saree
 Episode 8 Catwalk: Designers Catwalk Show
 Episode  9 Commercial: Image Soap commercial
 Episode 11 Photo shoot: Tenzin Bhutia Designs
 Episode 12 Photo shoot: Living Magazine

Season 3

After a hiatus of 5 years it was announced that Mega Model would return in 2015. The new host/head judge is the Nepalese beauty queen Malvika Subba. The other new judges will be Nepalese photographer Kishor Kayastha and male supermodel Prasant Tamrakar. The cast consist of 16 girls who will compete for the title of Image Mega Model Season 3.

Auditions
The auditions for the third season of Mega Model has started from Dharan Audition, Pokhara Audition and the final Kathmandu Audition. 
Because of the recent earthquake in Nepal the auditions have been postponed to later this year.
On June 29 it was announced on their official Facebook page that the postponed auditions will take place on August 5 in Pokhara and August 8, 9 and 10 in Kathmandu.

Prizes

The winner will receive NPR 200,000 prize money as well as a trip to Bangkok.

Contestants

(ages stated are at time of contest)

 Sneha was the Migme Wild Card Entry who made it to Top 16.

Call-out order

 The contestant was nominated for the best photo of that week. 
 The contestant was in the bottom, but was not eliminated.
 The contestant was voted back by the viewers but was eliminated again in the same episode.
 The contestant was eliminated.
 The contestant quit the competition.
  The contestant won the competition.

 In episode 13, Saina had to quit the competition due to personal reasons.
 In episode 224, nobody was eliminated.
 In the finale, Rajiya was voted back by the viewers

Photo shoot guide
 Episode 7 Photo shoot: Casting
 Episode 8 Catwalk: Walking in Cocktail dress
 Episode 14 Photo shoot: Moving Bus
 Episode 17 Photo shoot: Makeover Madness
 Episode 21, 22 Photo shoot: TVC for Healthy lifestyle
 Episode 24 Catwalk: Walking in Saree

Season 4

After a hiatus of 5 years it was announced that Mega Model would return in 2020. The new host/head judge is the Nepalese beauty queen Niti Shah. Nepalese photographer Kishor Kayastha returned as a judge along with fashion designer Bina Ghale. The cast consist of 16 girls who will compete for the title of Image Mega Model Season 4.

Auditions

The auditions for the fourth season of Mega Model has started from Dharan Audition, Pokhara Audition and the final Kathmandu Audition.

Prizes

The winner will receive NPR 500,000 prize money as well as other prizes from the sponsor.

Contestants

(ages stated are at time of contest)

Call-out order

  The contestant won Mega Model.
 The contestant was a runner-up.
 The contestant won the challenge.
 The contestant received positive critiques and was ultimately declared safe.
 The contestant received critiques but was ultimately declared safe.
 The contestant received negative critiques but was ultimately declared safe.
 The contestant was in the bottom.
 The contestant was eliminated.
 The contestant was voted back by the viewers but was eliminated again in the same episode.
 The contestant quit the competition.

Photo shoot guide

 Episode 9 Photo shoot: Personal style (casting)
 Episode 13, 14, 15 Video shoot: Introduction teaser
 Episode 16, 17 Catwalk: Harajuku-style in the market
 Episode 18, 19 Photo shoot: Wall climbing
 Episode 21 Commercial: TVC for various sponsor's product
 Episode 22 Photo shoot: Luxury in golden

References

External links 
 Official Mega Model Channel
 Official Mega Model Webpage
 Living Official Site

2008 in Nepal
2010 in Nepal
2011 in Nepal
2008 Nepalese television series debuts
2011 Nepalese television series endings
2000s Nepalese television series
2010s Nepalese television series